Paul Davids is an American independent filmmaker and writer, especially in the area of science fiction. Often collaborating with his wife Hollace, Davids has written and directed several films. He has also written episodes for the television series Transformers as well as a spin-off of the Star Wars series with his wife informally known as the Jedi Prince series.

Screenwriting

Television
 The Transformers (1985–1986)
 Defenders of the Earth (1986)
 Bionic Six (1987)
 Spiral Zone (1987)
 Garbage Pail Kids (1988)
 COPS (1988)
 Transformers: Generation 2 (1993)

Films
 Roswell (1994), a documentary about the Roswell UFO incident
 Timothy Leary's Dead (1997)
 Starry Night (1999), a film about Van Gogh
 The Sci-Fi Boys (2006) documentary called featuring interviews with Forry Ackerman, Ray Bradbury, Ray Harryhausen, and many more sci-fi notables.
 Jesus in India The Movie (2008) – a documentary on "American adventurer" Edward T. Martin's quest for the supposed unknown years of Jesus and Russian Nicolas Notovitch's claimed lost Life of Issa.

References

External links
Paul Davids' official website
Paul Davids UFO (link broken – July 8, 2010)
Review of The Sci-Fi Boys documentary at The Thunder Child

An exchange with Cecil Adams, of "The Straight Dope," on the Roswell Incident

20th-century American novelists
20th-century American male writers
American male novelists
American science fiction writers
Living people
Place of birth missing (living people)
Year of birth missing (living people)